Tyler David Thomas Ritter (born January 31, 1985) is an American actor who starred as Ronny McCarthy of The McCarthys.

Early life
Ritter is the son of actor John Ritter and brother of actor Jason Ritter. His grandfather was country singer Tex Ritter, who died a decade before Tyler was born. He grew up in Los Angeles. Despite having acted in high school plays and student films, following his father's unexpected death in 2003, he originally decided not to pursue acting professionally. After graduating from the University of Pennsylvania in 2007, he worked for three years as a teacher in Argentina. At the age of 25, he made the decision to return to Los Angeles and pursue an acting career.

Career
After featuring in guest roles on Modern Family and Grey's Anatomy, Ritter landed his first starring role on the 2014 sitcom The McCarthys, playing Ronny McCarthy, the openly gay son in a family of six. Ritter has discussed in interviews the bittersweet nature of his casting, with regard to the death of his father.

In 2015, Ritter was cast in NCIS as Abby Sciuto's brother Luca, appearing in both an episode of NCIS and NCIS: New Orleans.

2016 saw Ritter cast in two recurring roles.  He was cast in the role of Adam on the fourth season of Freeform's comedy Young and Hungry,  and was cast in the role of Detective Billy Malone on the fifth season of the CW series Arrow.

In 2020, he had a guest appearance in an Amazon Original series, Homecoming, directed by Julia Roberts.

Personal life
Ritter married Argentine film director Lelia Parma in 2007. In 2017, they welcomed their first child, a son named Benjamin Parma Ritter.

Filmography

Film

Television

References

External links

Living people
American male television actors
Male actors from Los Angeles
1985 births